Merkenfritzerbach is a small river of Hesse, Germany. It flows into the Nidder in Hirzenhain.

See also
List of rivers of Hesse

Rivers of Hesse
Rivers of Germany